HDMS Rota may refer to:

  a frigate of the Royal Danish-Norwegian Navy
 , a frigate of the Royal Danish Navy

References

Royal Danish Navy ship names